This is a list of museums in West Bengal state in eastern India.

See also
 List of museums in India

 
Museums
West Bengal
Lists of tourist attractions in West Bengal